Hordes may refer to:

Social and military structures of nomadic Turkic peoples in the Middle Ages; see:
Golden Horde
Mongol and Tatar states in Europe
The miniature war game Hordes (game)

See also
 Horde (disambiguation)